Darra Tang is a town and union council of Lakki Marwat District in Khyber Pakhtunkhwa province of Pakistan. It is located at 32°36'0N 71°10'0E and has an altitude of 220 metres (725 feet).

References

Union councils of Lakki Marwat District
Populated places in Lakki Marwat District